Sir (James) Clifton Robinson (1 January 1848 – 6 November 1910), born in Birkenhead, England, was known as the "Tramway King", having involvement in the building and operating of street tramways in New York City, London, Liverpool, Dublin, Cork, Bristol, Edinburgh and Los Angeles.

He was Managing Director of the Bristol Tramways, the Imperial Tramways Company, London United Tramways, and the Corris Railway.

He was awarded a knighthood in 1905 and died from heart disease in New York.

References

1848 births
1910 deaths
English knights
Tram transport in the United Kingdom
People from Birkenhead
Corris Railway
19th-century British businesspeople